Mukhtiyar was the position of head of executive of Kingdom of Nepal between 1806 and 1843. It was equivalent to Prime Minister of Nepal. There were 7 Mukhtiyars appointed between 1806 and 1843.

Meaning
Mukhtiyar is formed from two words: Mukhya and Akhtiyar. Mukhya means Chief and Akhtiyar means Authority. Altogether it means the "Executive Head of the State". Kumar Pradhan suggests that the word has Persian origin and denotes "competent-to-do" or broadly "Commander-in-Chief".

History
In 1806, the self denounced King Rana Bahadur Shah was made Mukhtiyar (chief authority) and Bhimsen Thapa tried to implement his schemes through Rana Bahadur. On the night of 25 April 1806, Sher Bahadur Shah, step-brother of Mukhtiyar in desperation drew a sword and killed Rana Bahadur Shah before being cut down by nearby courtiers, Bam Shah and Bal Narsingh Kunwar, also allies of Bhimsen. It triggered the Bhandarkhal massacre on the royal garden. On the grounds of the chaotic situation of the Bhandarkhal massacre, Bhimsen rose to the title of Mukhtiyar. The position of Mukhtiyar was under Pajani (Annual Renewal) system. During the annual muster of 1833, King Rajendra Bikram Shah delayed the retainment of Bhimsen's own position as the Mukhtiyar. On the false charge of murder of infant Prince Devendra on 1837, Bhimsen, his brother Ranbir Singh, his nephew Mathbar Singh, their families, the court physicians, Ekdev and Eksurya Upadhyay, and his deputy Bhajuman Baidya, with a few more of the nearest relatives of the Thapas were incarcerated, proclaimed outcasts, and their properties confiscated. Immediately after the incarceration of the Thapas, a new government with joint Mukhtiyars was formed with Ranganath Paudel as the head of civil administration, and Dalbhanjan Pande and Rana Jang Pande as joint heads of military administration. After about three months in power, under pressure from the opposing factions, the King removed Rana Jang as Mukhtiyar and Ranganath Paudel, who was favorably inclined towards the Thapas, was chosen as the sole Mukhtiyar. However, Ranganath Poudel, finding himself unsupported by the King, resigned from the Mukhtiyari, which was then conferred on Pushkar Shah; but Puskhar Shah was only a nominal head, and the actual authority was bestowed on Ranajang Pande. At the beginning of 1839, Ranjang Pande was made the sole Mukhtiyar. but Ranajang's inability to control the general lawlessness in the country forced him to resign from the office, which was then conferred on Puskar Shah, based on Senior Queen Samrajya Lakshmi's recommendation. There was also a brief army mutiny in June 1840. Brian Hodgson sent an indiscriminating report of mutiny to Governor General and he demanded the dissolution of the reigning government. Pushkar Shah and his Pande associates were dismissed by the King, and Fateh Jung Shah was appointed Mukhtiyar in November 1840. The Queen, seeking support of her own son's claims to the throne over those of Surendra, invited Mathabar Singh Thapa back after almost six years in exile. He was greeted with a grand welcome and was offered to lead the government. By December 1843, Mathabar Singh was appointed Prime Minister. Thus, the first Mukhtiyar to title himself as a prime minister, as per the British convention, was  Mathabar Singh Thapa.

List of Mukhtiyars of Kingdom of Nepal

See also
Kaji (Nepal)
Government of Nepal

References

Bibliography

 
1806 establishments in Nepal
1843 disestablishments in Nepal
Government of Nepal
Positions of authority
1800s neologisms
Political history of Nepal